William King (February 9, 1768June 17, 1852) was an American merchant, shipbuilder, army officer, and statesman from Bath, Maine. A proponent of statehood for Maine, he became its first governor when it separated from Massachusetts in 1820. He was the half-brother of Rufus King, who was a member of the Confederation Congress from Massachusetts, delegate to the Constitutional Convention of 1787, served as United States Senator from New York (from 1789-1796 and again from 1813-1825), and as Minister Plenipotentiary to the Court of St. James from 1796-1803 and again from 1825-1826.

Personal and business career

William King was born to Richard King, a merchant and shipowner, and Mary Black, on February 9, 1768, at Scarborough, then in the Province of Massachusetts Bay. His formal education was limited to local schools (he spent one term at Phillips Academy) and ended when he was thirteen. He was largely self-educated. Starting as a hand in a saw-mill, he went on to open his own mill.

King was employed in a variety of businesses, including as a shipbuilder, then a ship-owner. He became the largest merchant shipping owner in Maine. He became a successful merchant and a significant real-estate investor. He opened the first cotton mill in Maine, at Brunswick. He founded and was president of the first bank of Bath.

In 1812, what is now known as the Stone House, King's summer retreat, was built in rural Bath.

King was a Scottish Rite Freemason and later -while he was the Governor of the State- he became the first (Past) Grand Master of Maine, elected in June 1820, by the representatives of twenty-four Lodges which "met, adopted a Constitution, and elected officers".

Political career
King became active politically in 1795 as a member of the Democratic-Republican Party. He represented Topsham in the Massachusetts House of Representatives in 1795 and 1799. After he moved to Bath, he represented that town in 1804. He served in the Massachusetts Senate for Lincoln County from 1807 to 1811.

When the War of 1812 began, Massachusetts made him major general of the militia, in charge of the Maine district. He devoted much of his attention to coastal shipping and defenses. He also led recruiting efforts for the regular army, for which he was made a colonel in the United States Army. In 1813 King began a seven-year effort that started with his petition to Massachusetts for separation.

In 1816 he was re-elected to the Massachusetts Senate, and finally secured their approval for Maine to become a separate state, in 1818. The Missouri Compromise allowed Maine to be recognized as a state on March 15, 1820. He was shortly thereafter elected governor of the new state.

In May 1821, President James Monroe named him as one of three commissioners to settle land claims from the 1819 Onis-Adams treaty known as the Spanish Claims Commission. King resigned as governor  on May 28, 1821, to take the position of U.S. commissioner, serving until 1824.

In 1828 he was appointed by president Andrew Jackson to serve as Customs Collector of Bath.

With the shifting of political parties, he ran once more for governor, as a Whig in 1835, but lost.

Later life
King continued as a prominent business man, investor, and ship-owner. Even though he had a very limited education, he served for years as a trustee and overseer of Bowdoin College, and as a trustee of Waterville College (now called Colby College).

He died at home, in Bath, Maine, on June 17, 1852, and is buried in the city's Maple Grove Cemetery.

See also
 William King (Simmons)

Further reading
 Smith, Joshua M.  ""The Yankee Soldier's Might: The District of Maine and the Reputation of the Massachusetts Militia, 1800-1812," New England Quarterly LXXXIV no. 2 (June 2011), 234-264.
 Marion Smith; "General William King: Merchant, Shipbuilder, and Maine's first Governor"; 1980, Down East Books, .

References

External links
 
 National Governors Association
 Architect of the Capitol

1768 births
1852 deaths
Governors of Maine
People from Scarborough, Maine
People from Bath, Maine
Massachusetts state senators
Members of the Massachusetts House of Representatives
Maine Democratic-Republicans
Democratic-Republican Party state governors of the United States